Raymond John Tomlinson (born 19 February 1948) is an Australian basketball player. He competed in the men's tournament at the 1972 Summer Olympics and the 1976 Summer Olympics. In 2006, Tomlinson was inducted into the Basketball Australia Hall of Fame.

References

External links
 

1948 births
Living people
Australian men's basketball players
1970 FIBA World Championship players
1974 FIBA World Championship players
Olympic basketball players of Australia
Basketball players at the 1972 Summer Olympics
Basketball players at the 1976 Summer Olympics
Basketball players from Melbourne